The 2017 ICC Women's World Cup Final was a women's One Day International cricket match played between England and India to decide the winner of the 2017 Women's World Cup. England won the game by nine runs to secure their fourth World Cup title, with Anya Shrubsole named player of the match. It was one of the closest finals in tournament history, with only the 2000 final being decided by a narrower margin.

The final was played at Lord's, London, on 23 July 2017. Lord's had been announced as the host on 8 February 2016. The game was sold out, with a near-capacity crowd of around 24,000 in attendance. The bell to signal the start of play was rung by Eileen Ash, who at 105 years old is the oldest surviving international cricketer.

Background

Significance
England were playing in the Women's World Cup Final for the fifth time, a mark surpassed only by Australia. However, in the preceding five tournaments (1997–2013), England had made the final just once, defeating New Zealand in the 2009 final to claim their third World Cup title. India on the other hand was playing in the World Cup Final for only the second time in their history. The first had been a loss to Australia in 2005.

Route to the final

The group stage of the 2017 World Cup consisted of a simple round-robin, with each of the eight teams playing each other once and the top four teams progressing to the semi-finals. In the opening match of the tournament, India unexpectedly defeated England by 35 runs. However, England went on to win all six of their remaining group-stage games, finishing top of the table – with the same number of points as Australia but a superior net run rate. India finished third in the group stage, after losses to South Africa (by 115 runs) and Australia (by eight wickets).

In the first semi-final, played on 18 July at Bristol County Ground, England defeated South Africa by two wickets. South Africa batted first, posting a score of 218/6 from their 50 overs. Towards the end of their innings, England required three runs from the final over to win, with Anya Shrubsole hitting the winning runs off Shabnim Ismail with just two balls to spare.

The second semi-final, played at The County Ground, Derby, was reduced to 42 overs per side due to rain. India posted a score of 281/4, with Harmanpreet Kaur scoring 171 (not out) from 115 balls, including seven sixes. This was the highest individual score in the knockout stages of a World Cup, and was widely heralded as one of the greatest ever World Cup innings. In response, Australia was bowled out for 245, leaving India the victors by 36 runs.

Teams

Each team had 15 players in its tournament squad, 11 of whom played in the final. Both teams selected the same line-up for the final as they used in their semi-finals. Only five selected players had previously played in a World Cup final – Mithali Raj and Jhulan Goswami for India, and Katherine Brunt, Laura Marsh, and Sarah Taylor for England.

Match

England innings

England's captain Heather Knight won the toss and elected to bat. Their openers, Lauren Winfield (24 runs) and Tammy Beaumont (23), made steady progress, putting on 47 runs before Winfield was bowled by Rajeshwari Gayakwad. Beaumont was out three overs later, caught in the deep off the bowling of Poonam Yadav. This brought Heather Knight (1) to the crease, but she lasted just seven balls before also being dismissed by Yadav, leg before wicket (lbw; via DRS). Sarah Taylor (45) and Natalie Sciver (51) steadied the ship somewhat, putting on 83 runs for the fourth wicket whilst light rain fell. With the score at 146, Taylor was caught behind from the bowling of Jhulan Goswami. Goswami then had Fran Wilson out next ball, for a golden duck. Sciver also fell to Goswami a few overs later, unsuccessfully challenging an lbw decision. Katherine Brunt (34) and Jenny Gunn (25 not out) put on 32 runs for the seventh wicket before Brunt was run out by Goswami with a direct hit. Gunn continued on with Laura Marsh (14 not out) for the last four overs, with England finishing on 228/7 from their 50 overs. Jhulan Goswami was the pick of the Indian bowlers, finished with 3/23.

India innings
India lost a wicket in their second over, with Smriti Mandhana bowled by Anya Shrubsole for a duck. Punam Raut (86 runs) and Mithali Raj (17) then put on 38 runs before Raj was run out by Natalie Sciver. Raut and Harmanpreet Kaur (51) compiled a 95-run fourth-wicket partnership, lasting just over 20 overs, before Kaur was caught in the deep off the bowling of Alex Hartley. Raut then combined with Veda Krishnamurthy (35) for an additional 53 runs. Shrubsole then dismissed Raut lbw with India at 191 and led a batting collapse, with India losing their final seven wickets for just 28 runs. Hartley bowled Sushma Verma for a duck and Shrubsole claimed the wickets of Krishnamurthy and Jhulan Goswami before Shikha Pandey was run out. As the match reached its climax, India required 11 runs from the last two overs, but they could only add one more run before Shrubsole finished the job by dismissing both Deepti Sharma and Rajeshwari Gayakwad in four balls. Shrubsole – the player of the match – finished with 6/46 from 9.4 overs, the best bowling figures in any World Cup final.

Notes

References

!
2017
2017 in English women's cricket
2017–18 Indian women's cricket
World Cup 2017
World Cup 2017
2017 sports events in London
July 2017 sports events in the United Kingdom